The women's 50 metre freestyle competition of the swimming events at the 1999 Pan American Games took place on 7 August at the Pan Am Pool. 

This race consisted of one length of the pool in freestyle.

The gold medalist was Tammie Spatz of the United States of America.  The runner-up, Eileen Coparropa of Panama, won the first ever silver medal for her country in swimming at the Pan American Games.

Results
All times are in minutes and seconds.

Heats
The first round was held on August 7.

B Final 
The B final was held on August 7.

A Final 
The A final was held on August 7.

References

Swimming at the 1999 Pan American Games
1999 in women's swimming